Kocapınar (literally "big spring" in Turkish) may refer to the following places in Turkey:

 Kocapınar, Burdur
 Kocapınar, Elmalı, a village in Elmalı district of Antalya Province
 Kocapınar, Gönen, a village
 Kocapınar, Silifke, a village in Silifke district of Mersin Province